The Kassites were people of the ancient Near East, who controlled Babylonia after the fall of the Old Babylonian Empire c. 1531 BC and until c. 1155 BC (short chronology).

They gained control of Babylonia after the Hittite sack of Babylon in 1531 BC, and established a dynasty generally assumed to have been based first in that city, after a hiatus. Later rule shifted to the new city of Dur-Kurigalzu. By the time of Babylon's fall, the Kassites had already been part of the region for a century and a half, acting sometimes with the Babylon's interests and sometimes against. There are records of Kassite and Babylonian interactions, in the context of military employment, during the reigns of Babylonian kings Samsu-iluna (1686 to 1648 BC), Abī-ešuh, and Ammī-ditāna.

The origin and classification of the Kassite language, like the Sumerian language and Hurrian language, is uncertain, and, also like the two latter languages, has generated a wide array of speculation over the years, even to the point of linking it to Sanskrit. The Kassite religion is also poorly known. The names of some Kassite deities are known. The chief gods, titular gods of the kings, were Shuqamuna and Shumaliya. As was typical in the region, there was some cross pollination with other religions. After Babylon came within the Kassite sphere of control its city-god, Marduk was absorbed into the Kassite pantheon.

History
Documentation of the Kassite period depends heavily on the scattered and disarticulated tablets from Nippur, where thousands of tablets and fragments have been excavated. They include administrative and legal texts, letters, seal inscriptions, private votive inscriptions, and even a literary text (usually identified as a fragment of a historical epic). Unfortunately, many of those tablets have not yet been published, including hundreds held in the Ottoman Museum in Istanbul. About 100 Kassite tablets were found at Dur-Kurigalzu. A few inscribed building materials of Kurigalzu I were found at Kish. Several tablets dated to the reign of Agum III were found at the Dilmun site of Qal'at al-Bahrain. In total, about 12,000 Kassite period documents have been recovered, of which only around 10% have been published. There are also a number of building inscriptions, all but one written in Sumerian unlike the Akkadian typically used by the Kassites. A number of seals have also been found. Kudurrus, stone stele used to record land grants and related documents provide another source for Kassite history. This practice continued for several centuries after the end of the Kassite Dynasty. Often situated on the surface, many were found early and made their way to museums around the world.

The ancient city of Nippur was a major focus for the Kassites. Early on, refurbishments were conducted of the various religious and administrative buildings, the first of these datable to Kurigalzu I. Major construction occurred under Kadashman-Enlil, Kudur-Enlil, and Shagarakti-Shuriash, with lesser levels of repair work under Adad-shuma-usur and Meli-Shipak. Other important centers during the Kassite period were Larsa, Sippar and Susa. The Kassites were very active at Ur. At the site of Isin, which had been abandoned after the time of Samsu-iluna, major rebuilding work occurred on the religious district including the temple of Gula. The work at Isin was initated by Kurigalzu I and continued by Kadashman-Enlil I, and after a lapse, by Adad-shuma-usur and Meli-Shipak II. After the Kassite dynasty was overthrown in 1155 BC, the system of provincial administration continued and the country remained united under the succeeding rule, the Second Dynasty of Isin.

Middle Bronze Age

The origin of the Kassites is uncertain, though a number of theories have been advanced. They were reported in Babylonia by the 18th century BC, especially around the area of Sippar. The 9th year name of king Samsu-iluna (1749–1712 BC) of Babylon, the son of Hammurabi mentions them ie. ("Year in which Samsu-iluna the king (defeated) the totality of the strength of the army / the troops of the Kassites"). As the Babylonian empire weakened in the following years the Kassites became a part of the landscape, even at times supplying troops for Babylon.
The Hittites had carried off the idol of the god Marduk, but the Kassite rulers regained possession, returned Marduk to Babylon, and made him the equal of the Kassite Shuqamuna. Babylon under Kassite rulers, who renamed the city Karanduniash, re-emerged as a political and military power in Mesopotamia.

Late Bronze Age 

The fall of the First Sealand dynasty in 1460 BC created a power vacuum which the Kassites filled. After the destruction of the Mittani by the Hittites in the early 14th century BC Assyria rose in power creating a three way power structure in the region between the Kassites, Hittites, and Assyrians with Elam exerting influence from the east and Egypt from the south. A number of the Amarna Letters are correspondence between the respective rulers (including 14 between the Pharaoh and the Kassite ruler). An International System came into place between these parties connected by widespread trade, treaties, and intermarriage between the ruling classes (especially between the Kassites and Elamites). A typical treaties include the Egyptian–Hittite peace treaty (c.1259 BC) and the treaty between the Kassite ruler Karaindash and the Assyrian ruler Ashur-bel-nisheshu (c. 1410 BC).

At the peak of their power the Kassites, under Kurigalzu I in the mid 14h century BC, conquered Elam and sacked the capital of Susa. That ruler initiated  significant building efforts in Ur and other southern Mesopotamia cities. The most notable of these efforts was the construction of a new city, Dur-Kuirgalzu. It contained a number of palaces and also temples to many Babylonia gods including Enlil, Ninlil, and Ninurta. The Kassites also extended their power into the Persian Gulf, including at Qal'at al-Bahrain. Being in close proximity the Assyrians and Kassites often came into political and military conflict over the next few centuries. For a time in the early reign of Tukulti-Ninurta I Assyria gained ascendancy, until the Elamites under Kidin-Hutran III intervened. This period is marked by a building hiatus at Babylon, similar to the one after the fall of the First Babylonian dynasty.

Iron Age

The Elamites of the Shutrukid dynasty conquered Babylonia, carrying away the Statue of Marduk, in the 12th century BC, thus ending the Kassite state. According to the Assyrian Synchronistic Chronicle, which is not considered reliable, the last Kassite king, Enlil-nadin-ahi, was taken to Susa and imprisoned there in 1155 BC, where he also died.

The annals of the Assyrian king Sennacherib detail that on his second, eastern, campaign of 702 BC he campaigned against the land of the Kassites, that being along the along the Diyala River between the Jebel Hamrin and the Darband-i-Khan. The Kassites took refuge in the mountains but were brought down and resettled, in standard Assyrian practice, in Hardispi and Bit Kubatti, which were made part of the Arrapha district.

Kassite dynasty

The Babylonian and Assyrian king lists mention eight or nine early Kassite rulers whose names are not fully known and who precede the following kings. Another Kassite king, Hašmar-galšu, is known from five inscriptions from the Nippur area.

Note that the relative order of Kadashman-Turgu and Kadashman-Enlil II have been questioned.

Kassite language

The Kassite language has not been classified. The few sources consist of personal names, a few documents, and some technical terms related to horses and chariotry. What is known is that their language was not related to either the Indo-European language group, nor to Semitic or other Afro-Asiatic languages, and is most likely to have been a language isolate, although some linguists have proposed a link to the Hurro-Urartian languages of the Armenian highlands and Northern Mesopotamia. 

It has been suggested that several Kassite leaders bore Indo-European names, and they might have had an Indo-European elite similar to the Mitanni. Over the centuries, however, the Kassites were absorbed into the Babylonian population. Eight among the last kings of the Kassite dynasty have Akkadian names. It has also been suggested that the first element in Kudur-Enlil's name is derived from Elamite but that is disputed.

Kassite art

Ceramics 

The Kassites produced a substantial amount of pottery. It is found in many Moesoptamia cities including Eridu and Tell Khaiber. Archaeologists divide it into three periods, Early Kassite (pre c. 1415 BC), Middle Kassite (c 1415 BC - 1225 BC), and Late Kassite (c. 1225 BC - 1155 BC). Many small pottery kilns, generally no bigger than 2 meters in diameter with domed tops, were found in the Babylonian city of Dilbat. Goblets and wavy sided bowls are commonly found in Kassite pottery deposits. Other ceramic goods, such as traps for small animals and vessels commonly thought to be fruit stands were found also. Kassite pottery deposits have been found as far away as Al Khor Island in the Persian Gulf area.

Glass works 
Remnants of two Kassite glass beakers were found during the 1964 excavation in a (c. 800 BC) destruction layer of Hasanlu, in northwest Iran. The mosaic glass beakers are thought to have been heirlooms, possibly for ritual use the find spot being a temple. The panes of glass used to create these images were very brightly colored, and closer analysis has revealed that they were bright green, blue, white, and red-orange. A Kassite text found at Dur-Kurigalzu mentions glass given to artisans for palace decoration and similar glass was found there. Other similar glass dated 1500 BC was found at Tell al-Rimah.

Seal impressions 

Seals were used widely across the Near Eastern kingdoms during the Kassite rule. They were used to mark official items and ownership. The images created by these seals were unique to each seal, but many shared the same subject matter. Bearded men, religious symbols, horned quadrupeds, and fauna are often shown in these images. The seals were generally made of stone, glass, or clay. The images were made by stamping or rolling the seals into wet clay.

Gallery

See also
Chronology of the ancient Near East
List of Mesopotamian dynasties
Cities of the ancient Near East
Early Kassite rulers
Kassite deities
Kassite language
Kudurru

References

Sources 

Abraham, K. (2013). Kaštiliašu and the Sumundar Canal: A New Middle Babylonian Royal Inscription. Zeitschrift Für Assyriologie & Vorderasiatische Archäologie, 103(2), 183–195. https://doi.org/10.1515/za-2013-0012
Almamori, Haider Oraibi and Bartelmus, Alexa. "New Light on Dilbat: Kassite Building Activities on the Uraš Temple “E-Ibbi-Anum” at Tell al-Deylam" Zeitschrift für Assyriologie und vorderasiatische Archäologie, vol. 111, no. 2, 2021, pp. 174-190
K. Balkan, Die Sprache der Kassiten, (The Language of the Kassites), American Oriental Series, vol. 37, New Haven, Conn., 1954.
Bass, George F., et al. "The Bronze Age Shipwreck at Ulu Burun: 1986 Campaign." American Journal of Archaeology, vol. 93, no. 1, 1989, pp. 1–29
Brinkman, J. A.. "The Names of the Last Eight Kings of the Kassite Dynasty" Zeitschrift für Assyriologie und Vorderasiatische Archäologie, vol. 59, no. Jahresband, 1969, pp. 231-246
Brinkman, J. A. “Mu-Ús-Sa Dates in the Kassite Period.” Die Welt Des Orients, vol. 6, no. 2, 1971
Ferrara, A. J. “A Kassite Cylinder Seal from the Arabian Gulf.” Bulletin of the American Schools of Oriental Research, no. 225, 1977, pp. 69–69
Albrecht Goetze, "The Kassites and Near Eastern Chronology," Journal of Cuneiform Studies, vol. 18, No. 4, pp. 97–101, 1964
A. Leo Oppenheim, Ancient Mesopotamia: Portrait of a Dead Civilization, 1964.
Walter Sommerfield, The Kassites of Ancient Mesopotamia: Origins, Politics, and Culture, vol 2 of J. M. Sasson ed. Civilizations of the Ancient Near East, Charles Scribner's Sons, 1995

External links

Daniel A. Nevez, 'Provincial administration at Kassite Nippur' abstract of a dissertation gives details of Kassite Nippur and Babylonia.

 
States and territories established in the 16th century BC
States and territories disestablished in the 12th century BC
Babylonian dynasties
Ancient peoples of the Near East
Bronze Age Asia
History of Kuwait
Former empires
Former monarchies of Asia